Núria Aliaga-Alcalde is a Spanish chemist who is a professor at the Catalan Institution for Research and Advanced Studies. Her research considers molecular magnets and functional nanomaterials.

Early life and education 
Aliaga-Alcalde completed her undergraduate studies at the University of Barcelona. She was a doctoral researcher at Indiana University. Her research considered the synthesis of tetranuclear maganese single-molecule magnets. These polynuclear metal complexes can display unusual magnetic properties due to the large number of unpaired electrons. She was a postdoctoral researcher at both the Max Planck Institute for Chemical Energy Conversion and Leiden University.

Research and career 
In 2007, Aliaga-Alcalde joined the University of Barcelona, where she was made ICREA Researcher Professor at the Instituto de Ciencia de Materiales de Barcelona (ICMAB-CSIC). She established a research program focused on functional nanomaterials and the development of molecular magnets. She is particularly interested in curcumoids and porphyrinic-like coordination complexes.

Awards and honours 
 2019 Salvador de Madariaga Fellowship

Selected publications

References

External links 

Living people
University of Barcelona alumni
Indiana University alumni
Spanish chemists
Spanish women scientists
Year of birth missing (living people)